Los Violadores are a rock band from Argentina, pioneers of the punk rock genre in Latin America.

History
Los Violadores ("The Violators", referring to 'breaking the law', as mentioned in one of their songs, "Violadores de la Ley") was founded in Buenos Aires in 1981 by guitarist Hari "B" (born Pedro Braun). The rest of the band included Stuka (bass), Pil Trafa (vocals) and Sergio Gramatika (drums). In their first years, sometimes they had to perform under the name of Los Voladores ("The Flying Ones") because the censorship of the military government did not allow the original name of "Los Violadores".

After a while, Hari left the band and Stuka took his place at the guitar, with El Polaco taking on the bass; the latter was presumably a relative or an acquaintance of Hari B's. (El Polaco is Spanish for "the Pole". Hari was of Polish descent).

Their first hit was the song Represión ("Repression"), included on their first LP Los Violadores (1983), issued by the small label Umbral, and produced by Riff drummer Michel Peyronel.
In 1985 the band released a second album entitled Y ahora qué pasa, eh?, including the song "Uno, dos, ultraviolento", a new hit which granted them considerable radio airplay.

By 1985 some tension began to grow within the band, caused by differences about the musical style between Pil Trafa and Stuka. Stuka wanted to incorporate some post-punk and gothic rock influences, favouring the sounds of acts such as The Cure and U2 (which finally materialized in their 1986 album Fuera de sektor).
Singer Pil Trafa, on the other hand, wanted a more straightforward punk and heavier sound (evidenced in the 1987 album Mercado indio).

After some more albums released by CBS/Sony, such as Y que Dios nos perdone (1989) and Otro festival de la exageración (1991), they embarked on their farewell tour with young Argentine bands like Attaque 77 and 2 Minutos, ending in June of that year at the Estadio Obras Sanitarias in a gig with British punk legends U.K. Subs.

In late 1995 the band resumed its activity, they have reunited many times ever since, with different musicians, except singer Pil Trafa, who remained the only permanent member.
With bassist "Polaco" Zelazek and Anel Paz substituting guitarist "Stuka", they recorded the album Otra patada en los huevos, performing some comeback shows of the band at Cemento Discotheque, in December 1995.

In 2000 Stuka rejoined the band but in 2003 left once again.
Los Violadores have regained some popularity with their album Bajo un sol feliz (2006), and then participated in the festival 30 años de Punk, in 2009, with groups such as Cadena Perpetua and 2 Minutos, at Estadio Obras Sanitarias. That same year, the album Rey o reina was issued by means of Leader Music.

Los Violadores disbanded in May 2011, with the split announced by frontman Pil Trafa.
In 2015, Pil Trafa announced the reunion of the band once again, this time with the classic line-up, including Stuka, Gramatika, and "Polaco" Zelazek, recording the double live CD Luna Punk: Rompan todo.

Discography

Studio albums
1983 - Los Violadores
1985 - Y ahora qué pasa, eh?
1986 - Fuera de sektor 
1987 - Mercado indio
1989 - Y que Dios nos perdone
1991 - Otro festival de la exageración
1996 - Otra patada en los huevos
2000 - Lo mejor de Los Violadores (re-recorded versions)
2006 - Bajo un sol feliz
2009 - Rey o reina

Live albums
1990 - En vivo y ruidoso
1996 - Histórico (La verdadera historia) 2 CD 
2003 - En vivo y ruidoso II
2016 - Luna Punk: Rompan todo...

EPs
1986 - Uno, dos, ultravioladores
2004 - Y va... sangrando

Compilation albums
1992 - Grandes éxitos 
2001 - Obras cumbres

See also
 Argentine punk
 Latino punk
 Dirty War

References

Further reading 
Cavanna, Esteban M. El nacimiento del punk en Argentina y la historia de Los Violadores. Buenos Aires: Interpress Ediciones, 2001.

Sainz, Alfredo. "Arde Belgrano: Los Violadores in la UB, 17 de Julio de 1981." In Derrumbando la Casa Rosada: Mitos y leyendas de los primeros punks en Argentina 1978-1988, edited by Daniel Flores, 39-52. Buenos Aires: Pioloto de Tormenta, 2011.

External links
 Official website 
 Los Violadores at rock.com.ar 
Interview with Los Violadores vocalist Pil Trafa
 
 

Argentine punk rock groups
Rock en Español music groups
Musical groups established in 1981
Musical groups disestablished in 2019
Musical groups from Buenos Aires
1981 establishments in Argentina
2019 disestablishments in Argentina